Mark Stewart + Maffia is a compilation album by British singer Mark Stewart, released in 1986 through Upside Records. It was released in the United States to promote Stewart's first two solo efforts and contains tracks from Learning to Cope with Cowardice on side one and tracks from As the Veneer of Democracy Starts to Fade on the second side. The songs were remastered by Herb Powers Jr. for the compilation.

Track listing

Personnel 
Mark Stewart – vocals, production
The Maffia (side one)
Desmond "Fatfingers" Coke – keyboards
Charles "Eskimo" Fox – drums
Evar Wellington – bass
The Maffia (side two)
Keith LeBlanc – drums
Skip McDonald – guitar
Adrian Sherwood – keyboards, production
Doug Wimbish – bass
Technical
Herb Powers Jr. – mastering

References 

1986 compilation albums
Albums produced by Adrian Sherwood
Mark Stewart (English musician) albums